Myospila  is a genus from the fly family Muscidae.

Species List
M. alpina Hendel, 1901
M. bimaculata (Macquart, 1834)
M. meditabunda (Fabricius, 1781)

References

Muscomorph flies of Europe
Muscidae genera
Taxa named by Camillo Rondani